The National History Museum of Romania is a museum located on the Calea Victoriei in Bucharest, Romania, which contains Romanian historical artifacts from prehistoric times up to modern times.

The museum is located inside the former Postal Services Palace, which also houses a philatelic museum. With a surface of over 8,000 square meters, the museum has approx. 60 valuable exhibition rooms. The permanent displays include a plaster cast of the entirety of Trajan's Column, the Romanian Crown Jewels, and the Pietroasele treasure.

The building was authorized, in 1892, and the architect, Alexandru Săvulescu was sent with the postal inspector, Ernest Sturza, to tour various postal facilities of Europe for the design. The final sketches were influenced primarily by the postal facility in Geneva. Built in an eclectic style, it is rectangular with a large porch on a high basement and three upper floors. The stone façade features a portico supported by 10 Doric columns and a platform consisting of 12 steps spanning the length of the building. There are many allegorical sculptural decorative details.

, the museum is undergoing extensive restoration work and it is only partially open; a late medieval archaeological site was discovered under the building.

See also
 Romania lunar sample displays

References

External links 

Friends Association ( Romanian/English/French )

Museums in Bucharest
Historic monuments in Bucharest
Art museums and galleries in Bucharest
History of Bucharest
National museums of Romania
Archaeological museums in Romania
Museums of Dacia
History museums in Romania
Calea Victoriei
Plaster cast collections
Lipscani